The Chinese Contemporary Bible (当代圣经 Dangdai Shengjing) is a Bible translation by Biblica (formerly the International Bible Society) of Colorado Springs, Colorado, published in 2012.

The CCB is a translation from the Greek and Hebrew, replacing the Chinese Living Bible, New Testament (当代福音) originally published in 1974 by Living Bibles International, then republished in 1998 by IBS. The CLB was criticized for its reliance on the English Living Bible.

See also
 Chinese Bible Translations

References

External links
 Biblica  website 

1998 books
Contemporary Bible
1998 in Christianity